Chad Michael Murray (born August 24, 1981) is an American actor and writer. He is best known for playing Lucas Scott in The WB/CW drama series One Tree Hill (2003–09, 2012), a recurring role as Tristin DuGray on The WB/CW series Gilmore Girls (2000–01), and Charlie Todd in the fifth season of The WB series Dawson's Creek (2001–02). He had supporting roles in the films Freaky Friday (2003), A Cinderella Story (2004), House of Wax (2005), and Fruitvale Station (2013). Murray appeared in a supporting role in the Marvel/ABC series Agent Carter (2015–16), and had a recurring role as Edgar Evernever in Riverdale (2019).

He has written two novels, Everlast (2011) and American Drifter (2017); the latter was co-authored with the novelist Heather Graham.

Early life
Murray was born in Buffalo, New York, to Rex Murray, an air traffic controller. His mother left the family when Murray was 10 years old. He has three brothers, one sister, one half-brother, one step-sister, and one step-brother. He is of Scottish, English, German, Swiss-German, and Polish descent.

Murray attended Clarence High School in Clarence, New York. He became a fan of literature and played football. In his late teens, he broke his nose. This led to reports during his career that he had received a nose job. Murray clarified in a 2004 interview, "I got jumped in a Burger King when I was 18 and had my nose put on the other side of my face. It was three guys – what the hell was I supposed to do? The doctors didn't even bother running X-rays. They just reset it. But it wasn't a nose job – I hate the fact that people say it was a nose job!"

Acting career

1999–2002: Early work
Murray won a scholarship to attend a modeling convention in Orlando, Florida, where he met an agent who encouraged him to go to Los Angeles for a week and see what happens. He subsequently got a manager and moved to Hollywood in 1999. He started modeling for such brands as Skechers, Tommy Hilfiger and Gucci.

Then he was cast in the role of rich kid Tristin DuGray in Gilmore Girls; he was a recurring character in the first season of the series and appeared in one episode of the second season. He appeared in several guest starring television roles, including an episode of Undressed and an episode of Diagnosis: Murder. Murray portrayed the character Charlie Todd on the fifth season of the successful television series Dawson's Creek in 2001.

2003–2012: Breakthrough with One Tree Hill and films
In 2003, Murray appeared in the television film Aftermath: A Long Way Home. He then appeared in the Walt Disney Pictures feature film, Freaky Friday alongside Lindsay Lohan and Jamie Lee Curtis. The film was a major box office success, earning a total of $110,222,438 in the United States alone. Critics were mostly positive in their reviews of the film, and the film garnered a "B" grade on Yahoo! Movies and an 88% "Certified Fresh" approval rating on Rotten Tomatoes. Murray also appeared in the television film The Lone Ranger where he portrayed the role of Luke Hartman.

Later in the year of 2003, Murray won the main role of Lucas Scott in the successful WB television series One Tree Hill. The series quickly became the channel's biggest hit with over 4.50 million viewers on the first season's finale. The series was The WB's most successful and top rated television program when it first aired in 2003 and continued receiving top ratings for The CW. The series also earned Murray numerous awards, including two Teen Choice Awards, and spawned a book series. After Murray gained mainstream fame and media exposure, he also became a spokesperson for several high-profile deals. He and his One Tree Hill co-stars were the official endorsers for MasterCard and K-Mart. They endorsed Cingular Wireless and the Chevy Cobalt.

Following Murray's starring role on One Tree Hill, he appeared on the cover of several mainstream magazines such as Rolling Stone and People. That same year, he was voted as one of "TV's Sexiest Guys" in People magazine. In 2004, Murray starred in the romantic comedy A Cinderella Story with Hilary Duff. Though the reviews were mostly negative, the film went on to become a moderate box office success, earning $70.1 million worldwide. The film led to 2005 Teen Choice Awards wins in several categories. Later that year, Murray appeared on the cover of Teen People magazine.

In 2005, Murray starred in House of Wax. The film grossed $12 million in its first day. Though most film critics gave the film negative reviews, House of Wax earned over $70 million worldwide. The film led to Murray receiving the 2005 Teen Choice Awards win category for "Choice Movie Actor: Action/Adventure/Thriller". He featured briefly in the Iraq War drama Home of the Brave alongside Samuel L. Jackson and Jessica Biel in 2006. In May 2009, The CW announced Murray would not be returning to One Tree Hill for its seventh season. A video of Murray was recorded in which he was telling fans that they did not want him back because they wanted to save money. However, Mark Schwann said in an interview that he had been offered "great things" to return to the show.

In 2010, Murray played Alicia Keys's love interest in her music video for "Un-Thinkable (I'm Ready)". Then he played Ethan McAllister in Lifetime's TV movie Lies in Plain Sight. Murray also co-starred in Christmas Cupid with Ashley Benson and Christina Milian. The film is an ABC Family Original Movie and is "about a comatose girl who visits her Christmas past, present, and future".

In 2011, The CW announced he would return for a guest appearance as Lucas Scott in the final season of One Tree Hill. The episode aired on February 22, 2012.

2013–present: Television roles 
In 2013, Murray appeared in Fruitvale Station, a film chronicling the last day of Oscar Grant, who was killed by a police officer at a BART station. The film won two major awards at the 2013 Sundance Film Festival.

In August 2014, he was cast in a featured role as Agent Jack Thompson for Marvel's television series Agent Carter, and has returned for the second season.

On February 8, 2019, it was announced that Murray was cast in a recurring role as Edgar Evernever in The CW drama Riverdale. He appeared opposite Torrey DeVitto in Hallmark's Christmas film Five Cards for Christmas (2019). The film revolves around Jessica (DeVitto), who sends Christmas cards to five people who have impacted her life and Murray will appear as the son of a recipient of one of Jessica's letters. In 2021, he played Steve in hotel booking website Hotels.com's commercial.

Trivia 
Murray's regular dubbing voice for the French-speaking world is Yoann Sover who has dubbed his performances in 5 films, 8 tv movies and 4 tv series (including One Tree Hill, Agent Carter & Riverdale) as of 2022.

Writing career
Murray released a novel in September 2011 titled Everlast. In 2017, he published American Drifter: An Exhilarating Tale of Love and Murder, which he co-authored with the novelist Heather Graham. The romantic thriller was inspired by a dream.

Personal life

Murray became engaged to his One Tree Hill co-star Sophia Bush in May 2004, and they married on April 16, 2005, in Santa Monica, California. They announced their separation in September 2005. In February 2006, Bush filed papers for an annulment, citing fraud. Bush's petition was denied, and she and Murray were instead granted a divorce in December 2006.

Following his separation from Bush, Murray began dating Kenzie Dalton, whom he met in 2005 when Dalton, a first runner-up in the 2005 Miss North Carolina Teen USA pageant, was an extra on One Tree Hill. They became engaged in April 2006, but in August 2013, they called off their seven-year engagement.

In 2014, Murray began dating his Chosen co-star Sarah Roemer. In January 2015, it was announced that he and Roemer had married, and were expecting their first child. They have a son, born in 2015, and a daughter, born 2017.

Filmography

Film

Television

Music videos

Commercials

Bibliography
Everlast (2011)
American Drifter: An Exhilarating Tale of Love and Murder (2017), co-authored with Heather Graham

Awards and nominations

References

External links

 Official website
 
 Bio at TVGuide.com
 Bio at Starpulse.com

1981 births
21st-century American male actors
American male film actors
American male models
American male television actors
Living people
Male actors from Buffalo, New York
Male actors from New York (state)
Male models from New York (state)
People from Buffalo, New York
People from Clarence, New York
21st-century American male writers
American male novelists